The Hong Kong National Road Championships are held annually to decide the cycling champions in both the road race and time trial discipline, across various categories.

Men

Women

References

National road cycling championships
Cycle races in Hong Kong